Griff Williams (born January 23, 1966) is an American painter, publisher, art instructor, filmmaker, and gallerist. He owns Gallery 16 art gallery. His paintings have been exhibited in galleries and museums worldwide, including San Diego Museum of Art, Orange County Museum of Art, Crocker Art Museum in Sacramento, New Langton Arts, Andrea Schwartz Gallery and Stephen Wirtz Gallery, the San Jose Museum of Art, and the Eli Ridgeway Gallery. His work has been reviewed in Art in America, Frieze, Flash Art, SFAQ, and Artnet.com.

Early life, family, and education
Griff Williams was born in Butte, Montana in 1966. His father, Pat Williams, was elected to the Montana House of Representatives, and his mother, Carol Williams, served as the first female majority leader in the Montana Senate. His sister is philanthropist Whitney Williams.

Williams earned his BFA from the University of Montana, Missoula in 1984 and his MFA from the San Francisco Art Institute in 1993.

Career
In 1993, Williams founded Gallery 16 and Urban Digital Color in San Francisco, California. The gallery has exhibited the works of many influential contemporary artists, including Margaret Kilgallen, bell hooks, Paul Sietsema, Arturo Herrera, Rex Ray, Michelle Grabner, Mark Grotjahn, and Ari Marcopoulos.

Williams has been an instructor at the California College of the Arts, the San Francisco Art Institute, and Mills College.

He has also designed and published dozens of books with the Gallery 16 Editions imprint. His recent books include The Gay Seventies: Hal Fischer, the first monograph to feature the complete collection of works Hal Fischer produced in San Francisco's Haight and Castro neighborhoods in the 1970s. Published by Chronicle Books in 2020, his book on the life and artwork of the late San Francisco artist Rex Ray includes essays by Rebecca Solnit and Christian Frock.

Filmmaking
In 2021 Williams and his son, filmmaker Keelan Williams made a feature, Tell Them We Were Here. The film is a documentary about eight artists living and working in the San Francisco Bay Area who are guided by a belief that creativity is a tool for societal change. The artwork of Amy Franchescini, Alicia McCarthy, Sadie Barnette, Lynn-Herhsman-Leeson, Nigel Poor, Jim Goldberg, Michael Swaine, and Tucker Nichols are featured in the film with music by Marc Cappelle, Kelley Stoltz, Tommy Guerrero, Vetiver, and Devendra Banhart. The film was selected by film festivals around the world, including DOXA Documentary Film Festival, Big Sky Documentary Film Festival, and Newport Beach Film Festival. Tell Them We Were Here was awarded Best Feature Documentary at the Nevada City Film Festival. The San Francisco Chronicle gave the film its highest possible rating and stated, "the Williamses see art not as the exclusive domain of museums, galleries and collections, but as an essential component of a healthy society — something that can make communities not just more beautiful, but more functional."

Nominations
SECA Award from the San Francisco Museum of Modern Art, 2000
The Louis Comfort Tiffany Award, 2017

Collections
The following institutions have public holdings of Williams' work.
The Crocker Museum
Stanford Hospital
Neiman Marcus Collection
Progressive Insurance
Berkeley Art Museum and Pacific Film Archive

External links
griffwilliams.com
Gallery 16
Tell Them We Were Here

References

1966 births
Living people
People from Butte, Montana
San Francisco Art Institute alumni
University of Montana alumni
Artists from the San Francisco Bay Area
San Francisco Art Institute faculty
Painters from California